Daniele Battaglia (born 21 July 1981) is an Italian singer and television personality. In 2011 Battaglia participated in and won the seventh season of the RAI 2 reality show L'isola dei famosi.

He is the son of the musician Dodi Battaglia.

References

Living people
1981 births
Place of birth missing (living people)
21st-century Italian male  singers